A Tale of Five Cities ( and released as A Tale of Five Women in the US) is a 1951 British-Italian international co-production drama film directed by Romolo Marcellini and five other directors. The five cities cited in the title are: Rome, Paris, Berlin, London, and Vienna.

Plot
Englishman Bob Mitchell leaves his longtime home in America to enlist in the Royal Air Force. After the war has ended, a drunken accident in a Berlin nightclub results in his losing his memory. As he has no identity tags, doctors mistakenly repatriate him to America, where magazine writer Lesley learns of his condition. The only evidence of his past that he has is a set of five bank notes from different countries, each signed with a woman’s name. Lesley’s magazine sponsors a trip for him to visit the five countries where the bank notes were issued, hoping he'll learn crucial details of his identity.

Cast

 Bonar Colleano as Bob Mitchell
 Barbara Kelly as Lesley - American magazine writer
 Anne Vernon as Jeannine Meunier
 Karin Himboldt as Charlotte Smith (as Karin Himbold)
 Lily Kann as Charlady (as Lily Kahn)
 Danny Green as Levinsky
 Carl Jaffe as Charlotte's Brother
 MacDonald Parke as New York Magazine Editor
 Althea Orr as Matron (as Aletha Orr)
 Lana Morris as Delia Morel Romanoff
 Eva Bartok as Kathaline Telek
 Gina Lollobrigida as Maria Severini
 Geoffrey Sumner as Wingco
 Philip Leaver as Italian Official
 Annette Poivre as Annette
 Charles Irwin as London Editor
 Arthur Gomez as Carabinieri
 Dany Dauberson
 Andrew Irvine as Jimmy
 Vera Molnar
 O. W. Fischer
 Terence Alexander
 Raymond Bussières as Jeannine's brother
 Marcello Mastroianni as Aldo Mazzetti
 Enzo Staiola as A Boy
 Liliana Tellini
 Lamberto Maggiorani

Production
Shooting took place at the Riverside Studios and Walton Studios as well as on location around the various cities. The film's sets were designed by the art directors Don Russell, Jean d'Eaubonne, Fritz Jüptner-Jonstorff and Walter Kutz.

References

External links

1951 films
1951 drama films
Italian drama films
British drama films
Austrian drama films
French drama films
West German films
1950s Italian-language films
English-language Austrian films
English-language French films
English-language German films
English-language Italian films
British black-and-white films
Italian black-and-white films
Films set in London
Films directed by Romolo Marcellini
British anthology films
Films directed by Géza von Cziffra
Films directed by Emil-Edwin Reinert
British multilingual films
Italian multilingual films
Films with screenplays by Patrick Kirwan
Italian anthology films
French anthology films
German anthology films
1950s British films
1950s Italian films
1950s French films